Kevin Bracken (born October 29, 1971) is an American Greco-Roman wrestler who competed in the 2000 Summer Olympics, where he finished 6th place at 63 kg. He is currently the Head Coach of the Olympian Wrestling Club, Castle Rock, Colorado.

Career

High School career 
He attended St. Laurence High School in Burbank, Illinois, where he was captain and most valuable wrestler for their first state championship team in wrestling. Bracken provides the Kevin Bracken scholarship fund to St. Laurence high school.  He led the St.  Laurence Vikings to a team state championship in 1990. Bracken was coached by Bob Trombetta and Thomas M. Gauger. Gauger sparked Bracken’s interest in Greco-Roman wrestling that led to his success. Tom Gauger has coached several wrestlers that competed in the college ranks.

College 
In college, Bracken wrestled for Illinois State University before they eliminated their wrestling program during his final year. Bracken holds the record for the most career wins in the history of the Illinois State University, with 127. In 2005, he was inducted into the Illinois State University hall of fame.

National/International 
Bracken was a five-time national champion, three-time Alternate for the U.S. Olympic Team, and one-time Olympian. He was a Jr. National Championships runner-up in 1989 and Jr. National Champion in 1990 in Greco-Roman Wrestling. He was the 20-year-old age group National Champion in Greco-Roman and Freestyle and 5-time world team trials champion.

Honors and awards 
 1992, 1996, 2004 United States Olympic Team Alternate
 1993, 1995, 2001 Pan-American silver medalist 
 1996 World Cup Champion 
 2000 Olympic Team Member, 6th Place 
 2001 World Championships, 7th Place
 2003 Pan-American Champion
 Olympic Training Center Team Captain for six years
 1998, 2001, 2002, 2003 World Team Member

References

Wrestlers at the 2000 Summer Olympics
American male sport wrestlers
Olympic wrestlers of the United States
Living people
1971 births